J. E. B. v. Alabama ex rel. T. B., 511 U.S. 127 (1994), was a landmark decision of the Supreme Court of the United States holding that peremptory challenges based solely on a prospective juror's sex are unconstitutional. J.E.B. extended the court's existing precedent in Batson v. Kentucky (1986), which found race-based peremptory challenges in criminal trials unconstitutional, and Edmonson v. Leesville Concrete Company (1991), which extended that principle to civil trials. As in Batson, the court found that sex-based challenges violate the Equal Protection Clause.

Background 
On behalf of T.B., the mother of a minor child, the state sued J.E.B. for child support in Jackson County, Alabama. During jury selection, challenges intentionally targeted male potential jurors resulting in an all-female jury.

Decision 

The majority opinion was written by Justice Blackmun.  Justice O'Connor wrote a concurring opinion, and Justice Kennedy separately concurred in the judgment.  Chief Justice Rehnquist filed a separate dissenting opinion.  Justice Scalia also filed a dissenting opinion, which was joined by Chief Justice Rehnquist and Justice Thomas.

See also 
Hoyt v. Florida (1961)
 List of United States Supreme Court cases, volume 511
 List of United States Supreme Court cases
 Lists of United States Supreme Court cases by volume
 List of United States Supreme Court cases by the Rehnquist Court

References

Further reading

External links
 

United States Supreme Court cases
Batson challenge case law
United States civil procedure case law
1994 in United States case law
1994 in Alabama
20th-century American trials
Legal history of Alabama
United States Sixth Amendment jury case law
Jackson County, Mississippi
Child support
United States Supreme Court cases of the Rehnquist Court
United States gender discrimination case law